Sanfrè is a comune (municipality) in the Province of Cuneo in the Italian region Piedmont, located about  south of Turin and about  northeast of Cuneo.

The municipality of Sanfrè contains the frazioni (subdivisions, mainly villages and hamlets) Martini and Motta.

Sanfrè borders the following municipalities: Bra, Cavallermaggiore, Pocapaglia, Sommariva del Bosco, and Sommariva Perno.

Demographic evolution

References

Cities and towns in Piedmont
Roero